Muhammad Shoaib Siddiqui is a Pakistani politician who was a member of the Provincial Assembly of the Punjab, from 2004 to 2007 and again from October 2015 to May 2018.

Early life and education
He was born on 29 May 1969 in Lahore.

He has the degrees of Master of Science in Physics and the degree of Master of Science in Mathematics which he received in 1991 and 1993 respectively from University of the Punjab.

Political career

He was elected to the Provincial Assembly of the Punjab as a candidate of Pakistan Muslim League (Q) (PML-Q) from Constituency PP-156 (Lahore-XX) in by-polls held in 2004. He served as Parliamentary Secretary for Information from 2006 to 2007.

He ran for the seat of the Provincial Assembly of the Punjab as a candidate of Pakistan Muslim League (Q) from Constituency PP-156 (Lahore-XX) in 2008 Pakistani general election, but was unsuccessful. He received 6,773 votes and lost the seat to Chaudhry Yaseen Sohail.

He was re-elected to the Provincial Assembly of the Punjab as a candidate of PTI from Constituency PP-147 (Lahore-XI) in by-polls held in October 2015.

References

Living people
Punjab MPAs 2013–2018
Punjab MPAs 2002–2007
1969 births
Pakistan Tehreek-e-Insaf MPAs (Punjab)
Pakistan Muslim League (Q) MPAs (Punjab)
University of the Punjab alumni